All Guns Poolside is an album by the now defunct hardcore punk band, Redemption 87.

It was released in 1998 and subsequently re-released in 2002 by Blackout Records – with added bonus tracks which were the band's original demo from 1995.

It features vocalist, Eric Ozenne, who went on to form The Nerve Agents and Jade Puget who joined hardcore punk band, AFI, who are now an alternative rock band.

Track listing
 All songs written by Redemption 87, unless stated
"The Plague" – 1:48
"Stand" – 2:49
"A Dying Love Song" – 1:46
"Reflect" – 2:04
"How Can We Hide?" – 2:21
"What's New?" – 0:09
"G.T.M.C." – 2:22
"Tied Down" (Negative Approach) – 1:34
"The Big Takeover" (Bad Brains) – 2:32
"Hard Times" (Cro-Mags) – 1:24
"Spidey's Song" – 1:40
"Masquerade" – 1:32
"Can't Break Me" – 5:38
Tracks 11-13 were on the 2002 reissue. They were original demo songs from 1995.

Credits

Tracks 1 – 10
 Eric "87" Ozenne – vocals
 Jade Puget – guitar
 Ian Miller – bass
 Gary Gutfeld – drums
 Recorded January – February, 1997
 Produced by Andy Ernst and Redemption 87, except track 10 by Redemption 87
 Engineered by Andy Ernst, except track 10 by Craig Knepp
 Assistant engineered by Ian Miller
 Cover photographs by Rachel Ozenne

Tracks 11 – 13
 Eric Ozenne – vocals
 Timmy Chunks – guitar
 Ian Miller – bass
 Gary Gutfeld – drums
 Recorded Summer, 1995 
 Produced by Lars Frederiksen
 Engineered by Jeremy Goody

See also
 The Nerve Agents – Eric Ozenne's next band
 AFI (A Fire Inside) – Jade Puget's current band

External links
Blackout Records

1998 albums